Francis Dashwood, 11th Baron le Despencer, PC, FRS (December 1708 – 11 December 1781) was an English politician and rake, Chancellor of the Exchequer (1762–1763) and founder of the Hellfire Club.

Life and career

Early life
Dashwood was born in Great Marlborough Street, London, in December 1708. He was the only son of Sir Francis Dashwood, 1st Baronet (died 1724), and his second wife Mary, eldest daughter of Vere Fane, 4th Earl of Westmorland. Dashwood was a Protestant in religion who would help edit the Anglican Book of Prayer.

Francis and Mary had two children: a son Francis and a daughter Rachael. Sir Francis also had two surviving daughters from his first marriage, and two daughters and two sons from his third. So Francis Dashwood had a sister Rachael, and six half-siblings.

Dashwood was educated at Eton College where he became associated with William Pitt the Elder. Upon the death of his father on 4 November 1724, Dashwood, who was only fifteen, inherited his father's estates and the Baronetcy of Dashwood of West Wycombe.

Grand tours
Dashwood spent his youth and early adulthood abroad gaining a reputation for notoriety while travelling around Europe.  He impersonated Charles XII while in Russia and attempted to seduce Tsarina Anne, and was later expelled from the Papal states.

His sojourns abroad did also include classical aspects of the European Grand Tour. After travelling to France and then returning via Germany to England between January and September 1726, he did not venture abroad again until 1729, when he was away for two years returning in 1731. During this time he visited Italy (he was to return to Italy between 1739 and 1741 when stayed in Florence and Rome and visited Leghorn and the excavations at Herculaneum).

While in Italy he befriended the philosopher and theologian Antonio Niccolini (1701–1769). In 1733—between the visits to Italy—Dashwood accompanied George, Lord Forbes, envoy-extraordinary, to St Petersburg, stopping on the way at Copenhagen. In the opinion of Patrick Woodland, the author of his biography in the ODNB (2004), "His intelligent and discriminating diary of this expedition offers important first-hand descriptions of both capitals at this date".

Dilettanti Society and the Divan Club
In 1732 Dashwood formed a dining club called the Society of Dilettanti with around 40 charter members (some of whom may have been members of Wharton's original club) who had returned from the Grand Tour with a greater appreciation of classical art. William Hogarth drew Sir Francis Dashwood at his Devotions for Dilettante Viscount Boyne. "[I]f not the actual projector and founder of the Dilettanti Society, he was certainly its leading member in 1736". He took a prominent part in the proceedings of the Dilettanti Society, and in 1742 George Knapton painted Dashwood's portrait for the Society. On 2 March 1746, when John, Earl of Sandwich was suspended from his office of archmaster for "his misbehaviour to and contempt of the Society", Dashwood was elected in his place. Dashwood presented to the King various petitions from the society when it was seeking to acquire a permanent home.

In 1740, Dashwood was in Florence with Horace Walpole, Gray, and others, and shortly afterwards, got into trouble with Sir Horace Mann; there he had also made the acquaintance of Lady Mary Wortley-Montagu. By 1743 Horace Walpole was not impressed and described the Dilettanti Society as "a club for which the nominal qualification is having been to Italy, and the real one, being drunk; the two chiefs are Lord Middlesex and Sir Francis Dashwood, who were seldom sober the whole time they were in Italy".

However, the society did increasingly have a serious side, and Dashwood's work in that field resulted in his election as a Fellow of the Royal Society (FRS) in June 1746, and a fellow of the Society of Antiquaries of London (FSA) in June 1769. He also became a member of the Lincoln Club in the mid-1740s and the Society for the Encouragement of Arts, Manufactures, and Commerce in 1754. He had connections with the Spalding Society and became vice-president of both the Foundling Hospital and the General Medical Asylum.

In 1744 he and fellow Dilettante the Earl of Sandwich founded the short-lived Divan Club for those who had visited the Ottoman Empire to share their experiences, but this club was disbanded two years later.

Politics
On his return to England he obtained a minor post in the household of Frederick Lewis, Prince of Wales, and this connection, coupled with the dismissal of his uncle the Earl of Westmorland from his colonelcy of the first troop of horse guards, made Dashwood a violent opponent of Walpole's administration. He sponsored alleged spy-master Lord Melcombe's membership of the Dilettanti.

During the general election of 1741 Dashwood fought vigorously against Walpole's supporters and secured a seat for himself at New Romney on 5 May. In Parliament he followed Samuel Sandys, 1st Baron Sandys and vehemently attacked Sir Robert Walpole, declaring that abroad he was looked upon with contempt. Walpole's fall made no difference to Dashwood's position, and as a courtier of Frederick Lewis he was in chronic opposition to all of George II's governments.

In 1747 he introduced a poor-relief bill that recommended commissioning public works, such as the Hellfire Caves he later had excavated at West Wycombe Park, to combat unemployment, but it failed to pass.

Dashwood was re-elected for New Romney on 26 June 1747, and in January 1751 made a rather ostentatious disavowal of Jacobitism, of which Andrew Stone and others of George, Prince of Wales household were suspected. At Leicester House Dashwood abetted the influence of George Bubb Dodington (Lord Melcombe), and opposed the Regency Bill of 15 May 1751. On 13 April 1749 he was created D.C.L. of Oxford University, and on 19 June 1746 he was elected a Fellow of the Royal Society

The Hellfire Club

Dashwood was too young to have been a member of the very first Hellfire Club founded by Philip, Duke of Wharton in 1719 and disbanded in 1721, but he and John Montagu, 4th Earl of Sandwich are alleged to have been members of a Hellfire Club that met at the George and Vulture Inn throughout the 1730s. It was again at the George and Vulture that in 1746 Dashwood founded the precursor of his own Hellfire Club, a group called the "Knights of St. Francis". This was a parody of a religious order, based on a pun upon his own Christian name and that of the medieval Italian saint.

Apparently it was when he returned from one of his Grand Tours, around 1731, that Dashwood first had the idea of founding a parody of the Franciscan order. He had visited various monastic communities in Europe, "founded, as it were, in direct contradiction to Nature and Reason", and he thought that by founding "a burlesque Institution in the name of St Francis", he could prove the absurdity of such unnatural communities, by substituting "convivial gaiety, unrestrained hilarity, and social felicity [...] in lieu of the austerities and abstemiousness there practised."

In 1752 he moved the group's headquarters to his family home in West Wycombe, holding the first meeting on Walpurgis Night (April 30). The group was now known as "the Order of the Friars of St. Francis of Wycombe". The initial meeting was something of a failure and the group subsequently moved their meetings to the old abbey of Medmenham, about 6 miles from West Wycombe, where they called themselves the "Monks of Medmenham".

Medmenham Abbey was built by the Cistercian order, and beautifully situated on the banks of the Thames near Marlow, Buckinghamshire. Dashwood rented it from the owner, Francis Duffield, along with his half-brother Sir John Dashwood-King, his cousin Sir Thomas Stapleton, the satirist Paul Whitehead, and John Wilkes – a total of twelve men. They frequently repaired there during the summer.  They had the buildings restored by the architect Nicholas Revett in the style of the 18th-century Gothic revival. It is thought that Hogarth may have executed murals for this building; none, however, survive.

The members are thought to have included "Frederick, Prince of Wales, the Duke of Queensberry, the Earl of Bute, Lord Melcombe, Sir William Stanhope, K.B, Sir John Dashwood-King, bart., Sir Francis Delaval, K.B., Sir John Vanluttan, kt., Henry Vansittart, afterwards Governor of Bengal, (fn. 13) and Paul Whitchead the poet". Meetings occurred twice a month, with an AGM lasting a week or more in June or September.

According to Horace Walpole, who visited the abbey, the members' "practice was rigorously pagan: Bacchus and Venus were the deities to whom they almost publicly sacrificed; and the nymphs and the hogsheads [casks of spirits] that were laid in against the festivals of this new church, sufficiently informed the neighbourhood of the complexion of those hermits." Dashwood's garden at West Wycombe contained numerous statues and shrines to different gods: Daphne and Flora, Priapus, Venus and Dionysus. The members addressed each other as "Brothers" and the leader, which changed regularly, as "Abbot". During meetings members supposedly wore ritual clothing: white trousers, jacket and cap, while the "Abbot" wore a red ensemble of the same style. Rumour was that female "guests" (a euphemism for prostitutes) were referred to as "nuns". Club meetings were said to have included mock rituals, items of a pornographic nature, much drinking, "wenching" and banqueting. Legends of Black Masses and Satan or demon worship subsequently became attached to the club, beginning in the late Nineteenth Century.

Over the grand entrance to the abbey was placed, in stained glass, the famous inscription on Rabelais' abbey of Theleme, "Fay ce que voudras " [do what thou wilt]. The "monks" were said by some to have performed obscene parodies of Christian rites, as well as orgies of drunkenness and debauchery in which Dashwood was said to have used a communion cup to pour out libations to heathen deities. These details, possibly embellished, were described in a contemporary novel by the Anglo-Irish satirist Charles Johnstone.

Dashwood was approaching fifty, and thus ten years older than Thomas Potter whom Almon describes as the worst of the set and the corrupter of Wilkes; he was nearly twenty years older than Wilkes, and two years older than "the aged Paul" (Whitehead), who acted as secretary and steward of the order, and was branded by the satirist Charles Churchill as "a disgrace to manhood".

As a contrast to Medmenham Abbey, Dashwood erected a church on a neighbouring hill, which, as Churchill put it in "The Ghost", might "serve for show, if not for prayer", and Wilkes was equally caustic in his references to Dashwood's church "built on the top of a hill for the convenience and devotion of the town at the bottom of it".

Later political career

On 15 April 1754 Dashwood was re-elected to parliament for New Romney, and when the Buckinghamshire militia was raised on the outbreak of the Seven Years' War in 1757, Dashwood became its first colonel with Wilkes as his lieutenant colonel. In the same year, he made a praiseworthy effort to save the life of Admiral John Byng.

On 28 March 1761, he found a new seat in Parliament for Weymouth and Melcombe Regis (UK Parliament constituency); he was re-elected on 9 June 1762 on his appointment as Chancellor of the Exchequer, which he owed to his dependence upon Bute. "Of financial knowledge he did not possess the rudiments, and his ignorance was all the more conspicuous from the great financial ability of his predecessor Legge. His budget speech was so confused and incapable that it was received with shouts of laughter. An excise of four shillings in the hogshead, to be paid by the grower, which he imposed on cider and perry, raised a resistance through the cider counties hardly less furious than that which had been directed against the excise scheme of Walpole". Dashwood accordingly retired with Bute from the ministry on 8 April 1763, receiving the sinecure Keepership of the Wardrobe.

On 19 April he was summoned to Parliament as 11th Baron Le Despencer, the abeyance into which that barony had fallen on 26 August 1762, on the death of his uncle, John Fane, 7th Earl of Westmorland and 10th Baron Le Despencer, being thus terminated in Dashwood's favour.

He was now premier baronet of England and in the same year, he was made Lord-Lieutenant of Buckinghamshire, being succeeded in the colonelcy of the militia by John Wilkes. As Lord Le Despencer he now sank into comparative respectability and insignificance. He took a disgraceful part with John Montagu, 4th Earl of Sandwich, in raking up charges against their common friend Wilkes in connection with the Essay on Woman, and during Lord North's long administration from 1770 to 1781 he was joint Postmaster General. When, however, Chatham fell down in a swoon during his last speech in the House of Lords, Despencer was almost the only peer who came to his assistance. He died at West Wycombe after a long illness on 11 December 1781 and was buried in the mausoleum he had built there. His wife had died on 19 January 1769 and was also buried at Wycombe.

Family

On 29 May 1744 Horace Walpole wrote: "Dashwood (Lady Carteret's quondam lover) has stolen a great fortune, a Miss Bateman; but this match was not affected, and on 19 December 1745 Dashwood married at St. George's, Hanover Square, Sarah, daughter of George Gould of Iver, Buckinghamshire, and widow of Sir Richard Ellis, third baronet of Wyndham, Lincolnshire, who died on 14 January 1742. Horace Walpole described her as "a poor forlorn Presbyterian prude"; His marriage had no effect upon Dashwood's profligacy; according to Wraxall he "far exceeded in licentiousness of conduct any model exhibited since Charles II".

Dashwood left no legitimate issue, and the Barony of Le Despencer again fell into abeyance. One pretender to his title was his illegitimate daughter Rachel Fanny Antonina Dashwood, another was his sister Rachel, widow of Sir Robert Austen, 4th Baronet of Bexley, Kent, illegally assumed the title Baroness Le Despencer, but on her death the abeyance was once more terminated in favour of her cousin, Thomas Stapleton, 12th Baron. His granddaughter, Mary Frances Elizabeth, succeeded in 1848 as 13th Baroness, and her son, Evelyn Edward Thomas Boscawen, 17th Viscount Falmouth, succeeded as 14th Baron Le Despencer on 25 November 1891; see Baron le Despencer. Dashwood's baronetcy passed, on his death, to his half-brother, Sir John Dashwood-King (1716–1793).

Portrayal in literature and other media

Francis Dashwood has appeared in literary works by the following authors:
 Charles Brockden Brown in his 1798 novel Wieland describes the character Carwin as "specious seducer Dashwood."
 J. Meade Falkner in his 1895 novel The Lost Stradivarius describes the necromancer Adrian Temple as "acquainted with Francis Dashwood, the notorious Lord le Despencer ... many a winter's night saw him riding through the misty Thames meadows to the door of the sham Franciscan abbey ... of Medmenham."
 Robert Anton Wilson in his 1975 The Illuminatus! Trilogy and 1980–81 Schrödinger's Cat Trilogy.
James Herbert in the 1994 novel The Ghosts of Sleath.
 Eddie Campbell in the 1994 four-issue story arc Warped Notions for the comic book Hellblazer.
Kathy Reichs in the 2001 Novel Fatal Voyage.
 Carrie Bebris in her 2005 Regency novel Suspense and Sensibility.
 Mike Carey in the 2006 four-issue story arc Reasons to Be Cheerful for the comic book Hellblazer.
 Kage Baker in her 2007 short story "Hellfire at Twilight".
 Tom Knox in the 2009 novel The Genesis Secret.
 Diana Gabaldon in her 1998 novella Lord John and the Hellfire Club.
 Dashwood is mentioned in a longer version of the section "The Sailor's Hornpipe" on Mike Oldfield's debut album Tubular Bells.

See also
Dashwood baronets
Baron le Despencer
Dunston Pillar
St Lawrence's Church, West Wycombe
West Wycombe Caves
West Wycombe Park

References
Notes

Citations

Bibliography

Attribution

 Endnotes
 A volume of Dashwood's correspondence extending from 1747 to 1781 is in Egerton MS. 2136, and letters from him to Wilkes are in Addit. MS. 30867. See also Journals of the Lords and Commons;
 Official Return of Members of Parl.;
 Old Parliamentary History;
 Lists of Sheriffs, P.R.O.;
 
 Horace Walpole's Letters, ed. Cunningham, vols. i-v. and vii., Memoirs of George II, ed. Lord Holland, and of George III, ed. Barker;
 Wraxall's Hist. and Posthumous Mem., ed. Wheatle;
 Almon's Mem. and Corresp. of John Wilkes, ed. 1805;
 Bubb Dodington's Diary, ed. 1809, passim;
 Lady Mary Wortley Montagu's Letters;
 Chesterfield's Letters;
 Boswell's Johnson, ed. Hill;
 Charles Johnston's Chrysal, 1768;
 Churchill's Poems, The Ghost and the Candidate;
 Bedford Correspondence;
 Thomson's Hist, of the Royal Soc.;
 Nichols's Lit. Anecdotes, viii. 236, ix. 454 (where he is confused with Thomas Stapleton, his successor in the barony);
 Mahon's Hist, of England;
 Leeky's Hist, of England;
 Lipscomb's Buckinghamshire;
 Collinson's Somerset;
 Doran's 'Mann' and Manners at the Court of Florence;
 Cust's History of the Dilettanti Society, 1898, passim;
 Courthope's, Burke's, and G. E. Cokayne's Complete Peerages.

External links
Biography
 Sir Francis Dashwood (1708- 1781) by George Knowles at controverscial.com

Writings
Abridgement of the Book of Common Prayer (1773), by Benjamin Franklin and Francis Dashwood, transcribed by Richard Mammana

The Hellfire Club
The Hell-Fire Clubs from the Grand Lodge of British Columbia and Yukon
 The 'Hell Fire Club' by Marjie Bloy, PhD at The Victorian Web
 The Hellfire Club by Mike Howard at Talking Stick
Francis Dashwood of the English Hellfire Club
 The Lives & Times of the Hell-Fire Club

Other
 High politics and Hellfire: William Hogarth’s portrait of Francis Dashwood  by Robin Simon editor of The British Art Journal
 Photographs of Dashwood's tunnels in West Wycombe

1708 births
1781 deaths
18th-century English nobility
Dashwood, Francis, 2nd Baronet
Barons le Despencer
Dashwood, Francis, 2nd Baronet
Dashwood, Francis, 2nd Baronet
Dashwood, Francis, 2nd Baronet
Dashwood, Francis, 2nd Baronet
People from Wycombe District
Lord-Lieutenants of Buckinghamshire
Dashwood, Francis, 2nd Baronet
United Kingdom Postmasters General
People educated at Eton College
Fellows of the Royal Society
Hellfire Club